Tolype velleda, the large tolype moth or velleda lappet moth, is a species of moth of the family Lasiocampidae. It was first described by Caspar Stoll in 1791. The species is found from Nova Scotia to central Florida, west to Texas and north to Ontario.

The wingspan is 32–58 mm. The females are larger than the males. Males have whitish veins and a broad dark gray subterminal band on their forewings. The hindwings are dark gray, either with or without a whitish median band. Females have similar markings, but are paler and less contrasting. Adults are on wing from July to September in one generation per year.

The larvae feed on various broadleaf trees and shrubs, including Malus, Fraxinus, Populus, Tilia, Fagus, Betula, Prunus, and Quercus species. They are grayish with long hairs. Larvae can be found from June to August.

References

Moths of North America
Moths described in 1791
Macromphaliinae